"It's Over" is the second overall single from singer Jesse McCartney's third studio album, Departure. McCartney confirmed that "It's Over" is the second single when he made an appearance on Good Day Sacramento on August 5, he also confirmed it on 107.9 KDND radio, the same day. Jesse McCartney's Authorized Promotion Team (JMPT) also confirmed this on August 5 with a MySpace bulletin.

Music video
The music video premiered on Myspace on November 18, 2008.
The music video features McCartney performing the song on-stage with two male back-up dancers in a lounge bar. His on-video love interest is portrayed by actress and model Melissa Ordway.  The video shows several memories of McCartney and the girl, and toward the end of the memory she always disappears, a clear homage to Eternal Sunshine of the Spotless Mind.  McCartney described the video

Track listings and formats
EP - (EU iTunes Digital Download)
"It's Over" (Radio Edit)
"It's Over" (Remix aka Gimo Radio Edit)
"It's Over" (Club Re-Mix aka Gimo Club Mix)
"It's Over" (Single Version)
"It's Over" (Video)

Chart performance
The song debuted on the Billboard Hot 100 chart of October 18, 2008, at number 88. The song eventually peaked at number 62 on the chart.

Charts

References

2008 singles
Jesse McCartney songs
Pop ballads
Hollywood Records singles
Songs written by Brian Kennedy (record producer)
Songs written by Balewa Muhammad
Songs written by Ezekiel Lewis
Songs written by Candice Nelson (songwriter)
2008 songs
Songs written by Patrick "J. Que" Smith
Music videos directed by Rich Lee